Crystal Globe is the main award at the Karlovy Vary International Film Festival, first given in the Czech Republic city of Karlovy Vary in 1948.

IFFKV presents the following awards in the international film competition,:

Official selection awards
 Grand Prix - Crystal Globe for best feature film
 Special Jury Prize
 Best Director Award
 Best Actress Award
 Best Actor Award

Other awards
 East of the West Award
 Grand Prix for Best Documentary Film (For films over 30 minutes in length, and one for under 30 minutes)
 Festival President’s Award
 Právo Audience Award
 Non-statutory awards

Crystal Globe Winners - Grand Prix

Crystal Globe for Outstanding Artistic Contribution to World Cinema 

2008 - Robert DeNiro
2009 - John Malkovich, Isabelle Huppert
2010 - Jude Law
2011 - Judi Dench
 2012 - Susan Sarandon, Helen Mirren
2013 - John Travolta, Oliver Stone, Theodor Pištěk
 2014 - Mel Gibson
2015 - Richard Gere
2016 - Willem Dafoe
2017 - James Newton Howard
 2018 - Tim Robbins, Barry Levinson
2019 - Julianne Moore, Patricia Clarkson, Billy Crudup
 2021 - Michael Caine, Johnny Depp, Jan Svěrák

References

External links
  The official festival site / History
 Archived page of the official festival site includes more information about the award winners

Karlovy Vary International Film Festival
Czech film awards
Lists of films by award
International film awards
Awards established in 1948
1948 establishments in Czechoslovakia